"Money Folder" is the debut single by the hip-hop duo Madvillain, released ahead of their debut studio album Madvillainy. The single is backed by "America's Most Blunted", featuring Madlib's alter-ego Lord Quas.

Reception

Pitchfork ranked "America's Most Blunted" 278th on its list "The Top 500 Tracks of the 2000s".

Track listing

Charts

Personnel
Credits are adapted from the single's liner notes.

Personnel
 Madlib – production

Additional personnel
 Wolf – executive production
 Cooley – mastering
 Egon – project coordination

Artwork
 Coleman – photos
 Jank – design

References

2003 songs
 2003 singles
Madlib songs
Song recordings produced by Madlib
Song articles with missing songwriters